Sikhs: Legacy of the Punjab was a temporary exhibit at the Smithsonian Institution's National Museum of Natural History that highlights the art, culture, and history of the Sikh people. It was dedicated and opened to the public on July 24, 2004 and is a part of the broader Smithsonian Sikh Heritage Project which was launched in 2000. It then traveled to venues in California and Texas. 

The exhibition contains over 100 items from Sikh history and culture, including some artifacts that date back to the 18th century, many of which have been a part of private collections and have never been publicly viewed before. In addition, the exhibit contains photographs (two of them by Sikh historian and photographer Sandeep Singh Brar) that prominently highlight Darbar Sahib (The Golden Temple) and a copy of the Guru Granth Sahib from World War I.

References

External links 
 A Virtual Tour of the Sikh Exhibit
 Sikh Heritage Foundation

Sikh mass media
Smithsonian Institution exhibitions
2004 in Washington, D.C.